Aecidium amaryllidis is a species of fungus in the Pucciniales order. It was described by Syd., P. Syd and E.J.Butler in 1912.

References 

Fungal plant pathogens and diseases
Pucciniales
Fungi described in 1912
Taxa named by Hans Sydow
Taxa named by Paul Sydow